Mickey's Medicine Man is an American 1934 short film in Larry Darmour's Mickey McGuire series starring a young Mickey Rooney. Directed by Jesse Duffy, the two-reel short was released to theaters on May 18, 1934 by Post Pictures Corp. It was the last film in the Mickey McGuire series.

Synopsis
After Hambone's Uncle Nemo gets in a car accident, the kids decide to take over his taxi cab service. After accidentally wrecking Nemo's taxi, the kids decide to raise money by creating medicine, and putting on a medicine show.

Cast
In order by credits:
Mickey Rooney - "Mickey McGuire"
Billy Barty - Billy McGuire ("Mickey's Little Brother")
Marvin Stephens - "Katrink"
James Robinson - "Hambone Johnson"
Shirley Jean Rickert - "Tomboy Taylor"
Spencer Bell - Man with gout (uncredited)
Robert McKenzie - Angry motorist (uncredited)

External links 
 

1934 films
1934 comedy films
American black-and-white films
Mickey McGuire short film series
1934 short films
American comedy short films
1930s English-language films
1930s American films